Koryfi ( meaning pointy) is a settlement in the municipal unit of Iardanos, Elis, Greece. For the centuries the name of the village is Koukouvitsa (Κουκουβίτσας)- the bulgarian word for the bird cuckoo (Cuculus canorus) as many others bulgarnan names of settlements, fortresses and places wide sped on the Balkans, the bulgarian slavic name in the cold war years change to the present greek in 1955. It is situated in a hilly area, at 290 m elevation. It is 4 km northeast of Vounargo, 6 km southwest of Peristeri, 9 km southeast of Amaliada and 10 km north of Pyrgos. Its population in 2011 was 223 for the village and 246 for the community, which includes the monastery Fragkopidima.

Fortress of Koukouvitsa (Κάστρο Κουκουβίτσας), built without bricks, but form well formed big stone blocks as bulgarian medieval fortresses,  is located about 2.5 km north of the community.

Population

External links
 Koryfi GTP Travel Pages

See also

List of settlements in Elis

References

Populated places in Elis